Bear Dance is a Native American ceremonial dance that occurs in the spring. It is a ten-day event to strengthen social ties within the community, encourage courtship, and mark the end of puberty for girls.

For the Utes, it is a ten-day event of dancing, feasting, games, horse racing, and gambling. It is one of the oldest Ute ceremonies. The bear symbolizes leadership, strength, and wisdom. A group of men have played musical rasps for the dance.

Reason For The Bear Dance

The bear dance is performed by the Ute Indians after the first sound of thunder is heard as spring comes. This tradition began in the fifteenth century taught to humans by bears.  The primal ancestor of the Ute Indians are believed by themselves to be bears. The reason for this dance was to help wake up the hibernating bears in winter, and the Indians from being inside during the cold season. Along with waking up for winter finding a new mate for the new season is another reason this dance is performed by bears, and humans. Men, women, and children are involved in this yearly dance. For this dance the men are to prepare everything for the performance. During the dance women invite men to dance in order to find a mate, and dance together.

The Event of the Bear Dance 
Out of all the Ute ceremonies, the Bear Dance is said to be one of the oldest. It lasts a week to ten days. The Ute Indians start the bear dance in the spring when they hear the first thunder. The Ute Indians were now able to break winter camps and look for food and game.  The Ute were able to come outside again and release any stress or tensions that were there. Both men and women prepared for the bear dance. Clothes are made for families to be worn during the dance by the women. Each year, a new corral is made and is placed at the entrance of the dance. The corral and other things related to the dance are made by men. When the bear dance begins, a medicine man or chief directs the dance. Songs are played during the event, and children and adults dance like they saw the bears do. Legends say that the songs played by the Ute Indians showed respect to the bears spirits. These songs are played with wooden notched sticks by musicians. They also use drums and other musical instruments to play music. When the drums are played, they sing an incantation. They believe the incantation takes the noises to the caves of the bears which are then transformed into thunder. They dance and socialize until the ceremony is concluded. As the ceremony concludes, feasting begins and the dance was over.

References

Group dances
Ritual dances
Native American religion
Native American dances